Anisogomphus solitaris is a species of dragonfly in the family Gomphidae. It is endemic to Sri Lanka.  Its natural habitat is rivers. It is threatened by habitat loss.

References

Dragonflies of Sri Lanka
Gomphidae
Insects described in 1971
Taxonomy articles created by Polbot
Taxobox binomials not recognized by IUCN